Aodh Ó hEóthaigh,  (sometimes Anglicised as Hugh O'Neill) was a bishop in Ireland during the 14th century: the incumbent at Tamlaght and the Chancellor of Armagh, he was Bishop of Clogher  until his death on 27 July 1370.

References

14th-century Roman Catholic bishops in Ireland
Pre-Reformation bishops of Clogher
1370 deaths